Ralph L. Isselhardt (January 13, 1910 – October 24, 1972) was an American football player who played one season in the National Football League with the Detroit Lions and Cleveland Rams. He played college football at Franklin College. He first enrolled at Hillsboro High School in Hillsboro, Illinois before transferring to Marion High School in Marion, Indiana.

College career
Isselhardt played for the Franklin Grizzlies. He was inducted into the Franklin College Athletic Hall of Fame in 1975.

Professional career
Isselhardt played in one game for the Detroit Lions in 1937. He played in eight games for the Cleveland Rams during the 1937 season.

References

External links
Just Sports Stats

1910 births
1972 deaths
Players of American football from Illinois
American football guards
Franklin Grizzlies football players
Detroit Lions players
Cleveland Rams players
People from Hillsboro, Illinois